National Highway 730H, commonly referred to as NH 730H is a national highway in India. It is a spur road of National Highway 30.  NH-730H runs in the state of Uttar Pradesh in India.

Route 
NH730H connects Kudwa, Mihinpurwa, Motipur, Nishangarh, Bichia and Katarniaghat in the state of Uttar Pradesh.

Junctions  
 
  Terminal near Kudwa.

See also 
 List of National Highways in India
 List of National Highways in India by state

References

External links 

 NH 730H on OpenStreetMap

National highways in India
National Highways in Uttar Pradesh